"Critical Mass" is a science fiction short story by British writer Arthur C. Clarke, first published in 1949. This comic story describes the relationship between a village and a nuclear research facility located near it. On the day that the story takes place, a truck carrying a mysterious cargo has an accident, and the driver flees. The terrified villagers are about to begin an evacuation, when the narrator discovers that the cargo were merely hives of bees.

The piece was later published as the fifth story in Clarke's collection Tales from the White Hart (1957).

References

External links 
 

Short stories by Arthur C. Clarke
1949 short stories
Tales from the White Hart